The Behavior of Organisms is B.F. Skinner's first book and was published in May 1938 as a volume of the Century Psychology Series. It set out the parameters for the discipline that would come to be called the experimental analysis of behavior (EAB) and Behavior Analysis. This book was reviewed in 1939 by Ernest R. Hilgard. Skinner looks at science behavior and how the analysis of behavior produces data which can be studied, rather than acquiring data through a conceptual or neural  process. In the book, behavior is classified either as respondent or operant behavior, where respondent behavior is caused by an observable stimulus and operant behavior is where there is no observable stimulus for a behavior. The behavior is studied in depth with rats and the feeding responses they exhibit.

References

Further reading
 A Celebration of the Behavior of Organisms at Fifty (9 articles). Journal of the Experimental Analysis of Behavior, 50(2), pp. 277–358.
 Bissell, Margaret (2001). "1938: B.F. Skinner publishes The Behavior of Organisms: An Experimental Analysis". In Daniel Schugurensky (Ed.), History of Education: Selected Moments of the 20th Century (online).
 Roche, B. & Barnes, D. (1997). "The behavior of organisms?" The Psychological Record, 47, pp. 597–618.
Thompson, T. (1988). "Benedictus behavior analysis: B.F. Skinner's Magnum Opus at fifty". Contemporary Psychology, 33(5), 397–402.

External links
 B. F. Skinner Foundation (the publisher's website).

Behaviorism
History of psychology
Works by B. F. Skinner
Appleton-Century books
1938 non-fiction books